René Fülöp-Miller, born Philip René Maria Müller (17 February 1891 – 17 May 1963) was an Austrian cultural historian and writer.  He was born to an Alsatian immigrant and a Serbian mother in Karánsebes, Austria-Hungary (now Caransebeş, Romania) and died in Hanover, New Hampshire.

His father was a pharmacist and his mother was born a Brancovič, a family which played an important role in the military border region of southeastern Banat. 
He studied pharmacy, anatomy and psychiatry in Vienna, Berlin, Paris and Lausanne from 1909 to 1912. His teachers included Forel, Babinski and Freud. After his study, he worked in his father's pharmacy, but did not stay long. During the First World War he served on the Russian front. At this time he met the well-known Budapest opera singer Hedy Bendiner and married her. After the war, he worked as a journalist in various languages: he wrote in Hungarian for newspapers in Budapest and Kronstadt, he published German articles in Hermannstadt and Temeswar, and in Bucharest he worked for a respected Romanian press. 

Curiosity and a thirst for knowledge led him to the Soviet Union to study its cultural life. His first success as an author was with The Mind and Face of Bolshevism: An Examination of Cultural Life in Soviet Russia, published originally in German in 1926. This book is notable for the fact that at this date, Stalin does not appear to figure at all in the cultural life of the USSR. The book is still relevant as a deep analysis of the shipwreck of a state-censored culture. He followed this book with two more in quick succession, Lenin and Gandhi and Rasputin: The Holy Devil. The first book contrasted the violent revolutionary and the peaceful rebel and the second, the contradiction of a holy man who was a magnet for women. His most successful book was The Power and Secret of the Jesuits, which was still being reprinted after 1945. Through his travels in Europe and his work in renowned newspapers and on radio throughout the German speaking areas, Fülöp-Miller became a respected author in the time of the Weimar Republic.

In the 1930s, he went into self-imposed exile in America. He defined "Americanism" as a counter-cultural spirit to the world of faith. In Die Fantasiemaschine: Eine Saga der Gewinnsucht ["The Fantasy Machine: A Saga of Greed"] (1931), together with Joseph Gregor, he looked at the history of American theatre and cinema for evidence of the distorted image of the consumer world. This theme was continued in his English language essay, Dehumanization in Modern Society (1955). His first work of fiction was Katzenmusik ["Caterwauling"] (dated 1936 but 1935; trans Richard Winston as Sing, Brat, Sing 1947), a satirical tale of a four year old musical prodigy. His later fiction includes The Night of Time (trans Richard and Clara Winston from manuscript 1955) and The Silver Bacchanal (trans Richard and Clara Winston from manuscript 1960), two surreal tales set in the fictional city of Drohitz. He gave lectures on the history of European culture at Dartmouth College in Hanover and Hunter College in New York. Like many authors of the Weimar Republic and the exile generation, he has long disappeared from the public memory.

Works
 Rasputin: The Holy Devil, 1927
 The Mind and Face of Bolshevism: An Examination of Cultural Life in Soviet Russia, 1927
 The Russian Theatre: Its Character and History with Special Reference to the Revolutionary Period, 1927
 Lenin and Gandhi, 1927
 (ed. with Friedrich Eckstein) The Diary of Dostoyevsky's Wife, 1928
 The Power and Secret of the Jesuits, 1930
 The Ochrana: The Russian Secret Police, 1930
 (ed.) New Light on Tolstoy: Literary Fragments, Letters and Reminiscences not Previously Published, Issued under the Authority of the Tolstoy family, 1931
 (ed.) Under Three Tsars: The Memoirs of the Lady-in-Waiting, Elizabeth Narishkin-Kurakin, 1931
 Leo XIII and Our Times: Might of the Church-power in the World, 1935
 Leaders, Dreamers, and Rebels; an Account of the Great Mass-movements of History and the Wish-dreams that Inspired Them, 1935
 Katzenmusik ["Caterwauling"] (trans Richard Winston as Sing, Brat, Sing 1947), 1936
 Triumph over Pain, 1938
 The Saints that Moved the World: Anthony, Augustine, Francis, Ignatius, Theresa, 1945
 Fyodor Dostoevsky: Insight, Faith, and Prophecy, 1950
 The Night of Time, 1955
 The Silver Bacchanal, 1960 
 The Jesuits: A History of the Society of Jesus, 1963

References

External links
 
 The Papers of René Fülöp-Miller at Dartmouth College Library

PhD-project about Fülöp-Miller: https://www.igk-kulturtransfer.uni-freiburg.de/p/g1/katja-plachov/

1891 births
1963 deaths
20th-century Austrian historians
Cultural historians
People from Caransebeș
Austrian emigrants to the United States